Anthony Thompson (born 4 November 1994 in Liverpool, England) is an English footballer who plays as a goalkeeper for Warrington Town, having previously played professionally for Morecambe.

Career statistics

References

External links
 
 

1994 births
Living people
Association football goalkeepers
English footballers
English Football League players
National League (English football) players
Northern Premier League players
Rotherham United F.C. players
Chelmsford City F.C. players
Southport F.C. players
Morecambe F.C. players
Chester F.C. players
Altrincham F.C. players
Warrington Town F.C. players
AFC Fylde players
Ossett Town F.C. players
Curzon Ashton F.C. players